The Nepal women's national basketball team represents Nepal in international women's basketball competitions and is managed by the Nepal Basketball Association (NeBA).

Nepal joined FIBA in 2000.

Current roster
Nepal roster at the 2016 SABA Women's Championship:

Tournament record

Asian Games

3x3

SABA Championship 

 2016:

South Asian Games 

 2019:

References

External links
Official Website
Nepali Basketball News

Women's national basketball teams
Basketball